Nitraria billardierei, commonly known as nitre bush or dillon bush, is a perennial shrub native to Australia. It is often found in saline areas or other areas which have been disturbed. This species produces flowers predominantly in spring, with small ovoid or oblong fruit (drupe) that are purple, red or golden. The fruit are edible, said to taste like salty grapes. They were eaten, sometimes whole, including the stone, by indigenous Australians such as the Wemba-Wemba. Fruit can also be made into jam or dried and stored. 

Nitre bush is found across all mainland states of Australia. The plant's spread and germination in areas of heavy clay soil is assisted by the fruit's consumption by emus.

References

External links

Sapindales of Australia
Nitrariaceae
Flora of New South Wales
Flora of the Northern Territory
Flora of South Australia
Flora of Victoria (Australia)
Rosids of Western Australia
Halophytes